The 1987 NCAA Division I baseball season, play of college baseball in the United States organized by the National Collegiate Athletic Association (NCAA) began in the spring of 1987.  The season progressed through the regular season and concluded with the 1987 College World Series.  The College World Series, held for the forty first time in 1987, consisted of one team from each of eight regional competitions and was held in Omaha, Nebraska, at Johnny Rosenblatt Stadium as a double-elimination tournament.  Stanford claimed the championship for the first time.

Realignment
American discontinued their baseball program, leaving the Colonial Athletic Association with six schools sponsoring baseball.

Conference winners
This is a partial list of conference champions from the 1987 season.  The NCAA sponsored regional competitions to determine the College World Series participants.  Each of the eight regionals consisted of six teams competing in double-elimination tournaments, with the winners advancing to Omaha.  26 teams earned automatic bids by winning their conference championship while 22 teams earned at-large selections.

Conference standings
The following is an incomplete list of conference standings:

College World Series

The 1987 season marked the forty first NCAA Baseball Tournament, which culminated with the eight team College World Series.  The College World Series was held in Omaha, Nebraska.  The eight teams played a double-elimination format, with Stanford claiming their first championship with a 9–5 win over Oklahoma State in the final.

Award winners

All-America team

References